The Archaeological Journal is a peer-reviewed academic journal for archaeological and architectural reports and articles. It was established in 1844 by the British Archaeological Association as a quarterly journal, but was taken over by the British Archaeological Institute  (now known as the Royal Archaeological Institute) in 1845, and the institute has remained its publisher ever since. The journal has been published annually since 1927.

History 
The Archaeological Journal was established as a quarterly journal of the British Archaeological Association in 1844. When conflicts within that association led to the foundation of the rival British Archaeological Institute (now the Royal Archaeological Institute) in 1845, the Institute retained the journal, the Association instead publishing the Journal of the British Archaeological Association. Publication was quarterly (sometimes falling to twice or three times a year) until 1926. In 1927 the journal became an annual publication. From volume 51 (1894), issues bore the notice "second series".

Publication history 
The publisher of the journal has been variously listed as:
1844: Central Committee of the British Archaeological Association
1845–66: Central Committee of the Archaeological Institute of Great Britain and Ireland
1867 – Sept. 1875: Central Committee of the Royal Archaeological Institute of Great Britain and Ireland
Dec. 1875 – 1929: Council of the Royal Archaeological Institute of Great Britain and Ireland
1930–59: Royal Archaeological Institute of Great Britain and Ireland
1960–2015: Royal Archaeological Institute
2015–present: Taylor and Francis on behalf of the Royal Archaeological Institute

Editors 

The earliest volumes do not list a named individual as editor, however volume 1 (1844) contains an introduction to the journal by Albert Way, who is listed as Honorary Secretary, and following volumes are attributed to the Central Committee (up to volume 24) or Council (from volume 25). The annual report for Volume 100 (1943) mentions Philip Corder as resigning as editor, with C.F.C Hawkes taking the role on from Volume 101. V.M Dallas is mentioned as joint honorary editor 1953–1956 in the council report for volume 120 (1963). The journal includes a list of officers and council members including the named editor from volume 121 (1964).

 Vols 121–123: C.F. Stell
 Vols 124–125: J. Forde-Johnston
 Vols 126–132: M.J. Swanton
 Vols 133–137: David Parsons
 Vols 138–143: P. J. Reynolds
 Vols 144–148: R. T. Schadla-Hall
 Vols 149–151: Martin Millett
 Vol. 154: Blaise Vynver
 Vols 155–156: Blaise Vynver and Helena Hamerow
 Vols 157–159: Helena Hamerow
 Vols 160–164: M. F. Gardiner
 Vols 165–168: Patrick Ottaway
 Vols 169–174: Howard Williams
 Vols 175–179: Lisa-Marie Shillito
Current: Rhiannon Stevens

References

External links 

 
 Volumes 1–120 (1844–1963) at the Archaeology Data Service
 

Archaeology journals
Publications established in 1844
Annual journals
English-language journals
1844 establishments in the United Kingdom
Archaeology of the United Kingdom
Academic journals published by learned and professional societies